Bird Gets the Worm is an album led by saxophonist Cecil Payne recorded in 1976 and released on the Muse label.  The album features composition written, recorded, or inspired by Charlie Parker.

Reception

The AllMusic review by Scott Yanow called it a "high-quality straight-ahead date".

Track listing
All compositions by Charlie Parker, except as indicated.
 "Bird Gets the Worm" - 6:45 		
 "Repetition" (Neal Hefti) - 7:15 		
 "Ninny Melina" (Cecil Payne) - 5:35 		
 "Ko-Ko" - 5:35 		
 "Interpolation: All the Things You Are/Prince Albert/Bird of Paradise" (Jerome Kern /Kenny Dorham/Charlie Parker) - 6:15
 "Constellation" - 7:15

Personnel
Cecil Payne - baritone saxophone, flute
Tom Harrell - trumpet, flugelhorn 
Duke Jordan - piano
Buster Williams - bass 
Al Foster - drums

References

1976 albums
Cecil Payne albums
Muse Records albums
Albums produced by Michael Cuscuna